Bubbs Creek is a -long tributary of the South Fork Kings River in the Sierra Nevada of California, within Kings Canyon National Park.

The creek originates near Junction Pass (east of Forester Pass), in northeastern Tulare County. It flows north through a chain of lakes and enters Fresno County, where it turns west, flowing in a deep glacial canyon. It joins the South Fork Kings River at the eastern end of Kings Canyon.

The Pacific Crest Trail follows Bubbs Creek from Forester Pass as far as Vidette Creek, and the Bubbs Creek Trail follows the creek downstream of that point into Kings Canyon.

Bubbs Creek is named for John Bubbs, a prospector who crossed into the drainage from Owens Valley via Kearsarge Pass in 1864.

See also
List of rivers of California

References

Rivers of Tulare County, California
Rivers of Fresno County, California
Tulare Basin watershed